Durban North is an area to the north of Durban in the eThekwini Metropolitan Municipality, KwaZulu-Natal, South Africa. Durban North lies between the N2 freeway and the eastern seashore, with the Umgeni River forming its southern boundary. It has residential suburbs that are some of Durban's most affluent and is flanked by La Lucia in the north.

History 
In 1927 the Durban North Estates Company, a property development company, bought a large tract of land north of the Umgeni River known as the Prospect Hall Sugar Estate.  Plans were laid out for the development of the land into a residential suburb, and roads were built, beginning with Northway, to be the main arterial through the new suburb.  At the time access to the land across the Umgeni was limited to the Connaught Bridge further upstream.  In November 1927 the company completed the iron girder Athlone Bridge across the Umgeni River to link the new suburb at Northway to the established area of Stamford Hill in the South.  Following the completion of the bridge and enhanced access to the city, Durban North rapidly developed, followed by Virginia in the 1950s, and Glenashley in the 1970s.

Location and Suburbs

Durban North begins on the northern bank of the Umgeni River with the suburbs of Umgeni Park, Prospect Hall and Athlone.  Along the eastern coastline northwards towards La Lucia are the suburbs of Beachwood, Virginia and Glenashley.  Central Durban North is now officially known as Broadway, and is the commercial and educational hub of the area.  To the west at the boundary with Avoca and are the suburbs of Parkhill, Red Hill, Glen Anil, Glen Hills, Greenwood Park, Kenville and the industrial area, Briardene.

Roads and Airport 
The M12 Kenneth Kaunda Road/Umhlanga Rocks drive links the western suburbs of Durban North to the uMhlanga Ridge. The Ruth First Highway (M4) connects Durban North to the city and Umhlanga Rocks along the coast. Virginia Airport is situated along the northern shoreline.

Recreation Facilities, Beaches and Nature Reserves 
The Beachwood Mangroves Nature Reserve conserves the mangrove swamps of Beachwood on the northern bank of the Blue Lagoon.  Rocket Hut Beach is adjacent to the reserve and is known for its fishing and was the scene of a shark attack in 1947 and 1954.

Beachwood Country Club abuts the mangrove swamp, with a non-swimming beach known as Beachwood.  The golf course at Beachwood was redesigned by Gary Player in 1994.  Virginia Beach is just north of Beachwood, alongside the Virginia Airport.  Glenashley Beach is popular with locals, although it is officially a non-swimming beach.

The Umgeni River Bird Park is located on the banks of the Umgeni River in Umgeni Park.  Virginia Bush Nature Reserve is located in the suburb of Virginia, while Seaton Park Nature Reserve is found in Park Hill.  Durban North has a municipal swimming pool and a number of parks serviced by the eThekwini Municipality, including the Durban North Japanese Gardens.

Sports Clubs 
Northwood Crusaders, established in 1964, is a sportsground catering to the community and old boys of Northwood School.  Crusaders, as it is popularly known, has extensive sporting facilities for cricket, rugby, soccer, and athletics.  At the site of the old Glenwood Old Boys' Club is Riverside Sports, which offers rugby and soccer fields along with two artificial turfs for hockey.  Durban North is home to the Regent Harriers, an informal running club that has been meeting since 1960.

Education
There are a number of independent and government schools in the area.  Independent higher education provider Varsity College has a campus in Durban North.

Government Schools 
 Chelsea Preparatory School
 Danville Park Girls' High School
 Durban North College
 Glenashley Preparatory
 Northcrest Primary School
 Northlands Primary School
 Northlands Girls' High School
 Northwood School
 Rose Hill Primary School
 Virginia Preparatory School
 Greenwood Park Primary School
 Parkhill Secondary School
 Effingham Primary School
 Effingham Secondary School
 Columbia Primary School

Private Schools 
 Oakridge College
 Our Lady of Fatima Convent School
Hamptons High School

References

External links
Tourism site
 

Suburbs of Durban
2000 establishments in South Africa